Capsular-polysaccharide endo-1,3-alpha-galactosidase (polysaccharide depolymerase, capsular polysaccharide galactohydrolase) is an enzyme with systematic name Aerobacter-capsular-polysaccharide galactohydrolase. This enzyme catalyses the following chemical reaction

 Random hydrolysis of (1->3)-alpha-D-galactosidic linkages in Aerobacter aerogenes capsular polysaccharide

Hydrolyses the galactosyl-alpha-1,3-D-galactose linkages only in the complex substrate, bringing about depolymerization.

References

External links 
 

EC 3.2.1